St Paul's Anglican Grammar School is a multi-campus independent Anglican co-educational early learning, primary, and secondary day school, with campuses located in  and , Victoria, Australia.

Founded in 1982 in Warragul, St Paul's is a member of the South Eastern Independent Schools Association (SEISA), the Gippsland Independent Schools and the Junior School Heads Association of Australia.

St Paul's is located at two campuses in Warragul. The main campus is located on Bowen Street and has the Senior (Years 7 – 12) and Junior School Campus (Kindergarten to Year 6). The second campus is located in Traralgon. It was founded in 2002 and houses students from Kindergarten to Year 10. There was formerly a third campus, the "rope factory", located in Warragul, which was designed to house the separate Year 9 program.

History
St Paul's was founded by a group of local parents in 1982, and began teaching classes in Sunday School rooms on the premises of the local Anglican Church in Warragul. The school's founding teacher was Ken Wilson, who remains a current member of staff, and the founding principal was Des Parker; many parents assisted the school during its inception as staff members, some of whom remain as members of staff.

In 2002 to celebrate the school's 20th year a pictorial journal entitled <connections> was published giving a photographical insight of the schools young life from a church hall paved the way to the respected independent co-educational institution it had become.

In celebrating the school's 20 years a special event was held at St. Paul's Cathedral, Melbourne. The entire school cohort was in attendance and this marked an important chapter in the school's life.

The Traralgon school was made by parents pushing for a school in the area. The first head of school was Lorraine Mark. Then headlined by Andy Mcnabb, who was head of the school from 2008 - 2018. Then Gwen Hunter in 2019 and lastly Tracey King for 2020.

The history of the first 25 years of the school was published in 2007 as No Ordinary Days by author Laele Pepper. This book covers all aspects of the foundation and the school, its growth into a five campus school, special programmes, sporting achievements and contributions by parents and friends. It also contains a comprehensive staff list to 1982–2007 and a full list of alumni from 1982 to 2007.

Through its life St Paul's has been governed by four principals. The first was Des Parker who served from the school's inception to 1993. At this point Richard Prideaux, took over as principal, and would continue to serve the school for fourteen years before stepping down at the end of the school year in 2006. The next principal was Mark Robertson, who was the principal of the school until June 2010 at which point he tendered his resignation. Lisa Moloney was installed as principal in February 2011 with Mike Clapper currently the Executive Principal, with his departure to occur at the completion of the 2012 school year.

On 7 September 2013, a celebration was held to honour the 30th anniversary of St Paul's. The event was open to all alumni, teachers, ex-teachers and friends of the school.

Principals
The following individuals have served as Principal of St Paul's Anglican Grammar School:

Campuses
 Warragul
Bowen Street
 Waragul ELC – Kindergarten and early learning 
 Junior School – Years prep – 6
 Senior School – Years 7 – 12
Sutton Street
 The Rope Factory – Year 9
 Traralgon
 Traralgon Senior School – Years 7 – 10
 Traralgon Junior School – Years K – 6

Curriculum
St Paul's students study towards the Victorian Certificate of Education (VCE), which is the main secondary student assessment program in Victoria which ranks students with an Australian Tertiary Admission Rank (ATAR) for university entrance purposes.

House system
The house system is very important to the structure of the school, and there is substantial rivalry between houses in swimming, athletics, and choral competitions, among others. The house system also provides pastoral care and a degree of mentoring to students. 
Below are the houses with their respective colours and name sakes.

 Monash – navy blue, in honour of Sir John Monash
 Lalor – gold, in honour of Peter Lalor
 Franklin – orange, in honour of John Franklin
 Paterson – green, in honour of Banjo Paterson
 Chisholm – red, in honour of Caroline Chisholm
 Gilmore – purple, in honour of Dame Mary Gilmore

A simplified four colour system is employed in the junior school, consisting of Burgundy, Emerald, gold, and navy houses.

Notable alumni

Caleb Serong-AFL Footballer
Harry McKay (footballer)-AFL Footballer
Ben McKay (footballer)-AFL Footballer

Education cost
To enrol for an education at the school, prices vary depending on the year level of the child.

See also

List of non-government schools in Victoria

References

External links
 

Anglican primary schools in Victoria (Australia)
Educational institutions established in 1982
Anglican secondary schools in Victoria (Australia)
Gippsland Independent Schools
Junior School Heads Association of Australia Member Schools
1982 establishments in Australia